The 2015 Women's NORCECA Champions Cup (Final Four) was played from June 5 to June 7 in Havana, Cuba. The Dominican Republic won the tournament and together with Cuba, both qualified for the 2015 FIVB Volleyball Women's World Cup in Japan.

Qualification
The top four teams from the NORCECA confederation who did not yet qualify for the 2015 FIVB Volleyball Women's World Cup played a single round robin system playoff. The United States did not play because they were already qualified as 2014 World Champions. The next three best NORCECA ranking joined the host country for the tournament.

Qualified teams
 (Host)
 (NORCECA Ranking 2)
 (NORCECA Ranking 4)
 (NORCECA Ranking 5)

Venues

Pool standing procedure
 Numbers of matches won
 Match points
 Points ratio
 Sets ratio
 Result of the last match between the tied teams

Match won 3–0: 5 match points for the winner, 0 match points for the loser
Match won 3–1: 4 match points for the winner, 1 match point for the loser
Match won 3–2: 3 match points for the winner, 2 match points for the loser

Results
All times are Cuba Daylight Time (UTC−04:00).

Final standing

Awards

Most Valuable Player
  Lisvel Eve Mejia
Best Outside Spiker
  Melissa Vargas
  Aurea Cruz
Best Middle Blocker
  Daymara Lescay
  Lucille Charuk
Best Setter
  Jennifer Lundquist
Best Opposite Spiker
  Karina Ocasio
Best Libero
  Janie Guimod
Best Scorer
  Melissa Vargas
Best Server
  Sheila Ocasio
Best Digger
  Brenda Castillo
Best Receiver
  Emily Borrel

See also
2015 NORCECA Men's Champions Cup (Final Four)

References

qualification
NORCECA
2015 in Cuban sport
International volleyball competitions hosted by Cuba
Sport in Havana